Ronny Rosenthal (born 11 October 1963), nicknamed "Rocket Ronny", is an Israeli former footballer who played as a forward.

After starting his career in his birth city with Maccabi Haifa, Rosenthal went on to play in Belgium with Club Brugge and Standard Liège. He moved to Liverpool in 1990 for a fee of £1.1 million, becoming the first non-UK player to move to an English club for more than £1 million. After four years at Liverpool, Rosenthal finished his career with Tottenham Hotspur and Watford.

Between 1983 and 1997 he made 60 appearances for the Israel national team, scoring 11 goals.

Early and personal life
Rosenthal was born in Haifa, Israel, His father was born in Bucharest, Romania and is of Ashkenazi Jewish descent, immigrated to Israel. His mother was born in Morocoo and is of both Sephardi Jewish and Mizrahi Jewish descent, also immigrated to Israel. His brother Lior Rosenthal is also a former footballer whoh played for Maccabi Haifa the Israel national team. 

Rosenthal married a Belgian, Nancy, who converted to Judaism. Their two sons, Dean Rosenthal—who was Bar Mitzvah in Israel—and Tom Rosenthal, were born in England. Dean is director of a sporting management company; while Tom, formerly on the books of Queens Park Rangers as a midfielder, formerly played for the Dutch team FC Dordrecht, and has been capped by Belgium at the under-18 and U19 levels—where he scored three goals—and has switched to Israel and was named to its U21 national team in 2018 for the Euro 2019 qualifiers against Germany and Norway. 

Rosenthal now resides in London, and has worked as a football agent and consultant. His nephew is Israeli international footballer Denny Gropper.

On 11 May 2019, Rosenthal and his family were subjected to a "terrifying ordeal", when masked machetes-holding robbers, raided his home in Cricklewood, England.

Club career
He was left-footed, and began his playing career with Maccabi Haifa in the city in which he was born in his native Israel, winning two Israeli league titles.  Rosenthal left his homeland to sign for Belgian side Club Brugge KV in 1988. He scored 15 goals in two seasons, and won the Belgian league title one season.

He then joined English side Liverpool on loan in March 1990, as manager Kenny Dalglish looked to increase his options for the forward positions during Liverpool's league title run-in. He scored seven goals in eight Football League First Division games, including a hat-trick against Charlton Athletic, which helped Liverpool secure their third league title in five seasons. His move to Anfield was then made permanent for a fee of £1 million - double the fee which had been quoted before the loan deal was agreed. At Anfield, he became a cult hero.

During the 1990–91 season, Rosenthal faced continued fierce competition for a place in the first team from Liverpool's established strikers Ian Rush and Peter Beardsley, and then from mid-season signing David Speedie. He played 16 times in the league, and scored five goals as Liverpool finished second in the league. In 1991–92, Rosenthal played 20 times in the league, but it was a frustrating league campaign for both player and club, as the Reds finished sixth in the league and Rosenthal only found the net three times. Liverpool did win the FA Cup that season, but Rosenthal was not selected for the final. Despite the pre-season departure of both Speedie and Beardsley, Rosenthal was now faced with competition for a place from new signing Dean Saunders. 1992–93 was slightly better, as Rosenthal played 27 games in the new Premier League, and scored six goals, but it was another frustrating season for Liverpool, who finished sixth in the league once again and spent most of the season occupying even lower positions. Saunders had been sold to Aston Villa early in the season, while new signing Paul Stewart proved to be a major disappointment. A memorable occasion during that first Premier League season came when Rosenthal hit the crossbar with a shot on an open goal in a league match against Aston Villa.

With the arrival of Nigel Clough in the summer of 1993, and the breakthrough of Robbie Fowler soon after, Rosenthal played just three league games for Liverpool in 1993–94 and was sold to Tottenham Hotspur in January 1994. Rosenthal scored on his debut in February 1994, in a home defeat to Sheffield Wednesday. He became a regular member of the first team at White Hart Lane, playing 15 league games and scoring twice before the season's end. Despite Teddy Sheringham overcoming injury problems, and the close season signing of Jürgen Klinsmann, Rosenthal still managed to appear in 20 Premier League games in 1994–95, though he failed to score. His best form came in the FA Cup, in which he scored five goals in Tottenham's run to the semi-final. This included a hat-trick in a 6–2 fifth round replay win at Southampton. Klinsmann was then sold to Bayern Munich and Spurs signed Chris Armstrong, but Rosenthal still played in all but five of Tottenham's 38 Premier League games in 1995–96, mostly as a substitute, but only scored one goal.

1996–97 brought a similar story for player and club. For the third consecutive season, Spurs fell short of a UEFA Cup place, while Rosenthal was on the scoresheet only once in the league, and this time was restricted to 20 league appearances. In more than three years in North London, Rosenthal had appeared in 88 league games (55 of them starts) but scored just four goals. He then dropped down two divisions to sign for Watford, and played 30 games over the next seasons and scored eight goals as Watford won back-to-back promotions to reach the FA Premier League. He then retired from playing at the age of 35.

International career 
Rosenthal was also a regular member of the Israeli national football team for most of his career. He won his first senior cap in 1983, and by the time his international career drew to a close in 1997, he had been capped 60 times and scored 11 goals.

See also
List of Jewish footballers

References

External links
 
 Ronny Rosenthal's page on Official Liverpool F.C. web site
 Ronny Rosenthal's index at Sporting-heroes.net
 LFChistory.net player profile

1963 births
Living people
Israeli Ashkenazi Jews
Israeli footballers
Association football forwards
Israel international footballers
Israeli expatriate footballers
Maccabi Haifa F.C. players
Club Brugge KV players
Standard Liège players
Liverpool F.C. players
Tottenham Hotspur F.C. players
Watford F.C. players
Liga Leumit players
Belgian Pro League players
Premier League players
Expatriate footballers in Belgium
Expatriate footballers in England
Israeli expatriate sportspeople in Belgium
Israeli expatriate sportspeople in England
Footballers from Haifa
Israeli people of Romanian-Jewish descent
Israeli people of Moroccan-Jewish descent
Ashkenazi Jews
Sephardi Jews
Mizrahi Jews